This page lists the World Best Year Performance in the year 1999 in the men's decathlon. The main event during this season were the 1999 World Athletics Championships in Seville, Spain, where the competition started on Tuesday August 24, 1999, and ended on Wednesday August 25, 1999. Tomáš Dvořák broke the world record, collecting 8994 points at a meet in Prague, Czech Republic.

Records

1999 World Year Ranking

See also
1999 Hypo-Meeting

References
decathlon2000
IAAF
apulanta
IAAF Year Ranking

1999
Decathlon Year Ranking, 1999